Power and the Passion is the fourth studio album by the German rock band Eloy, released in 1975. The story follows Jamie, the son of a scientist, who absorbs a "time eroding" drug and finds himself in Paris, in the year 1358. He meets Jeanne, whom he introduces to marijuana. After time spent in jail following a peasants' mutiny against their landlord, Jamie finds an eccentric magician that sends him back to his own time frame.

Track listing
All songs written by Eloy and Gordon Bennit.
Side One
 "Introduction"  – 1:11
 "Journey into 1358"  – 2:54
 "Love Over Six Centuries"  – 10:09
 "Mutiny"  – 9:08

Side Two
"Imprisonment" – 3:13
 "Daylight" - 2:38
 "Thoughts of Home" - 1:05
 "The Zany Magician" - 2:48
 "Back into the Present" - 3:02
 "The Bells of Notre Dame" - 6:21

2001 Remastered Edition Bonus Track

"The Bells of Notre Dame (Remix 1999)" - 6:34

Personnel
Frank Bornemann — vocals, guitar
Manfred Wieczorke — organ, piano, mellotron, synthesizers
Luitjen Janssen — bass
Detlef Schwaar — guitar
Fritz Randow — drums
Arranged & Produced by Eloy
Engineered By Wolfgang Thierbach

References

External links

1975 albums
Eloy (band) albums
Concept albums